Farshad Ahmadzadeh (born 23 September 1992) is an Iranian football player playing for Sepahan in the Persian Gulf Pro League.

Club career

Parseh
Ahmadzadeh started his professional career with Azadegan League side Parseh, where he played 18 games, scoring two goals in his first and only season with the club.

Persepolis

After a decent season with Parseh, Ahmadzadeh joined Persepolis in August 2012 signing a five-year contract.
He made his Persepolis debut during a 6–0 win against Malavan on 19 December 2012 in a Hazfi Cup match. During his time at Persepolis, Ahmadzadeh won the Persian Gulf Pro League twice, as well as an Iranian Super Cup

Tractor (loan)
At the beginning of summer 2013, Ahmadzadeh joined Tractor on loan so that he could serve his military duty. After two years on loan, meaning he had fully served his conscription duty, Ahmadzadeh was recalled back to Persepolis. During his time at Tractor Ahmadzadeh won a Hazfi Cup.

Śląsk Wrocław 
On 4 July 2018, Ahmadzadeh officially joined Polish football club Śląsk Wrocław. He had joined Śląsk Wroclaw on a 1-year contract.

Return to Persepolis
On 23 June 2019, Ahmadzadeh signed a new three-year contract with Persian Gulf Pro League champions Persepolis. But he was placed on Persepolis' transfer list.

Foolad 
On 13 January 2019, Ahmadzadeh officially joined Iranian football club Foolad.

Club career statistics

1Includes Iranian Super Cup.

International career

U-23
He was called to the Iran U22 team for AFC U-22 Asian Cup qualification by coach Alireza Mansourian.

Honours

Club
Tractor
Hazfi Cup: 2013–14
Persepolis
Persian Gulf Pro League: 2016–17, 2017–18
Iranian Super Cup: 2017

Foolad
Hazfi Cup: 2020–21

References

External links

 Farshad Ahmadzadeh at PersianLeague.com
 Farshad Ahmadzadeh at IranLeague.com
 

1992 births
Living people
People from Urmia
Iranian footballers
Damash Iranian players
Tractor S.C. players
Persepolis F.C. players
Śląsk Wrocław players
Persian Gulf Pro League players
Azadegan League players
Ekstraklasa players
Iranian expatriate footballers
Expatriate footballers in Poland
Association football midfielders
Iranian expatriate sportspeople in Poland